Marian Neuteich (29 May 1890 - c.1943) was a Polish-Jewish composer, cellist and conductor.

During World War II, Neuteich was in the Warsaw Ghetto, where he was one of the conductors of the Jewish Symphony Orchestra. He was murdered in the Trawniki concentration camp.

Selected filmography
 Róża (1936)

References

1890 births
1943 deaths
Polish cellists
Polish conductors (music)
Male conductors (music)
Polish composers
Warsaw Ghetto inmates
Jewish composers
Polish civilians killed in World War II
Polish people executed in Nazi concentration camps
People who died in Trawniki concentration camp
20th-century conductors (music)
20th-century composers
20th-century male musicians
20th-century cellists